Malawi–Turkey relations are foreign relations between Malawi and Turkey. The Turkish ambassador in Lusaka, Zambia is also accredited to Malawi. Malawi is accredited to Turkey from its embassy in Berlin, Germany. Turkey has plans to open an embassy in Lilongwe.

Diplomatic Relations 
During the talks discussing the creation of the Federation of Rhodesia and Nyasaland, the black majority in Malawi did not support the federation, arguing that the federation would benefit the European settlers and not Africans. Turkey expressed concern when Federation of Rhodesia and Nyasaland was established in 1953 and supported Nyasaland African Congress, which aimed to create a majority-rule country, diplomatically. In 1958, Dr. Hastings Banda, a member of Nyasaland African Congress, was sent to prison. Turkey supported the Devlin Commission of 1959 that exonerated Hastings Banda.

Following declaring independence, Turkey has provided limited economic assistance to Malawi, where there was a climate of political and economic stability.

Economic Relations 
 Trade volume between the two countries was 21 million USD in 2019 (Turkish exports/imports: 4.7/16.4 million USD).

See also 

 Foreign relations of Malawi
 Foreign relations of Turkey

References

Further reading 

 “Broad, Daniel. Southern and Northern Rhodesia and Nyasaland Economic and Commercial Conditions. London: His Majesty's Stationery Office, 1950.	
 “Daube, J.M. Education in Malawi: A Bibliography. Limbe: Government Printer, 1970.	
 “Fenton, Thomas and Heffron, Mary. Africa: A Directory of Resources. Maryknoll: Orbis, 1987.	
 Africa Since 1914: A Historical Bibliography. Santa Barbara: ABC-Clio Information Service, 1985.	
 Aldcroft, Derek, ed. Development of British Industry and Foreign Competition, 1875–1914. Toronto:University of Toronto Press, 1968.	
 Amer, J. A Key to Development in Southern Malawi. Blantyre, 1966.	
 Apthorpe, Raymond. "Rhodesia and Nyasaland" in Women's Role in the Development of Tropical and Subtropical Countries. Brussels:International Institute of Differing Civilizations, 1959.	
 Barber, William. The Economy of British Central Africa. Stanford University Press, 1961.	
 Barnekov, Timothy. An Inquiry into the Development of Native Administration in Nyasaland, 1888–1939. Syracuse:Syracuse University Press, 1968.	
 Bell, M. Military Assistance to Independent African States. London:Institute for Strategic Studies, 1964.	
 Besterman, Theodore. A World Bibliography of African Bibliographies. 4th ed. Totowa: Rowman & Littlefield, 1975.	
 Blackhurst, Hector. African Bibliography. Manchester: Manchester University Press, 1985.	
 Blake, Wilfred. Central African Survey: Facts and Figures of Rhodesia and Nyasaland. London: A. Redman, 1961.
 Booth, Richard. The Armed Forces of African States. London:Institute for Strategic Studies, 1970.	
 Bowman, E. The Training of Native Authorities in Community Work: A Nyasaland Experiment. Blantyre: Jeanes Conference, 1936.	
 Brown, Edward, et al. A Bibliography of Malawi. Syracuse: Syracuse University Press, 1965.	
 Bullwinkle, Davis. Women in Eastern and Southern Africa: A Bibliography 1976–1985. Westport: Greenwood Press, 1989.	
 Buvinic, Mayra. Women and World Development: An Annotated Bibliography. Washington, DC: Overseas Development Council, 1976	
 Casada, James. Dr. David Livingstone and Henry Morton Stanley: A Bibliography. New York:Garland Publishers, 1977.	
 Chancellor College Library. Research in Progress in Malawi and About Malawi. Zomba: Chancellor College, 1976.	
 Chancellor College Library. Working List of Publications 1973–1976. Zomba: Chancellor College, 1976.	
 Clegg, E. Race and Politics. London:Oxford University Press, 1960.	
 Current Bibliography on African Affairs. Westport, quarterly.	
 Davies, Ioan. African Trade Unions. Baltimore: Penguin, 1966.	
 Davis, J. and Baker, J., eds. Southern Africa in Transition. New York: Praeger, 1966.	
 Davis, Merele, ed. Modern Industry and the African. London: Macmillan, 1933.	
 Dean, Edwin. The Supply Responses of African Farmers. Amsterdam: North Holland Publishing Company, 1966.	
 Dickie, J. and Rake, A. Who's Who in Africa. London: African Buyer and Trader, 1973.	
 Dorien, Ray. Venturing to the Rhodesia and Nyasaland. London: Johnson, 1962.	
 Duignan, P., ed. Guide to African Research and Reference Works. Stanford:Hoover Institute Press, 1970.”
 Dupuy, Trevor. The Almanac of World Military Power. New York: Bowker Company, 1972.	
 Epstein, A.L. The Administration of Justice and the Urban African. London:H.M. Stationery Office, 1953.	
 Frankel, S.H. Capital Investment in Africa. London: Africa Research Survey, 1938.	
 Getachew, Gebrewold. A Bibliography on Economic Development. Addis Ababa:Economic Commission, 1975.	
 Giorgis, Belkis. Selected and Annotated Bibliography on Women and Health in Africa. Dakar: Aaword, 1986.	
 Gregory, Joel. African Historical Demography: A multidisciplinary bibliography. Los Angeles:Crossroads, 1984.	
 Grey, Mark. A Bibliography on Education in Development and Social Change in Subsaharan Africa. Lewiston: Mellen Press, 1989.	
 Grier, Beverly. Guide to Library Resources for the Study of Southern Africa. New Haven:Yale University Press, 1977.	
 Hamalengwa, M. The International Law of Human Rights in Africa: Basic Documents and Annotated Bibliography. Dordrecht: Nijhoff, 1988.	
 Hammond, Frederick D. Report on the Nyasaland Railways and Proposed Zambesi Bridge. London: Her Majesty's Stationery Office, 1961.	
 Hancock, William Keith. Survey of British Commonwealth Affairs: Problems of Economic Policy 1918–1939. London: Oxford University Press, 1942.	
 Hardy, Ronald. The Iron Snake. London: Collins, 1965.	
 Havnevik, Kjell. The IMF and the World Bank in Africa. Uppsala: Scandinavian Institute of African Studies, 1987.	
 Hazlewood, Arthur. Rail and Road in East Africa. Oxford: Blackwell, 1964.	
 Hazlewood, Arthur. The Economics of Underdeveloped Areas; An Annotated Reading List. Westport:Greenwood Press, 1975.	
 Heard, Kenneth. Political Systems in Multi-Racial Societies. Johannesburg:Institute of Race Relations, 1961.	
 Heninge, David. Works in African History: An Index to Reviews 1960–1974. Waltham:African Studies Association, 1976.	
 Hill, Mervyn. Permanent Way. 2nd ed. Nairobi: East Africa Railways and Harbours, 1949.	
 Hirschmann, David. Women's Participation in Malawi's Local Councils and District Development Committees. East Lansing: Michigan State University, 1985.	
 Hodgkin, T. African Political Parties. Harmondsworth: Penguin, 1961.
 Hooker, James. The Businessman's Position: Observations on Expatriate Commerce in Malawi. Hanover: American Universities Field Staff, 1971.	
 Humphrey, David. Malawi Since 1964. Zomba: University of Malawi Economics Department, 1974.	
 International Africa Institute. Selected Annotated Bibliography of Tropical Africa. London, 1956.
 International African Bibliography. London, quarterly.	
 International Institute of Labor Studies (I.I.L.S.). Labor Problems in the Economic and Social Development of Malawi. Geneva:International Institute of Labor Studies, 1967.	
 Irvine, A.G. The Balance of Payments of Rhodesia and Nyasaland, 1945–1954. London: Oxford University Press, 1959.
 Khofi, L.M. Malawi Parliament:practice and procedure. Zomba: Government Printer, 1974.			
 Konovalov, Eugenii. Malawi. Moscow, 1966.	
 Lee, Margaret. SADCC: The Political Economy of Development in Southern Africa, Nashville:Winston-Derek Publishers, 1989.	
 Mackay, Peter. A Portrait of Malawi. Zomba: Government Printer, 1964.	
 Made, Stanley. One Hundred Years of Chichewa in Writings, 1875–1975, a recent bibliography. Zomba: Chancellor College, 1976.	
 Mair, Lucy. The Nyasaland Elections of 1961. London: Athlone Press, 1962.		
 Martello, W. and Butler, J. The History of Subsaharan Africa: A Select Bibliography of Books and Reviews, 1945–1975. Boston: University Press, 1978.	
 Martens, George. African Trade Unionism; A Bibliography. Boston: G.K. Hall, 1977.	
 Morton, Kathryn. Aid and Dependence:British Aid to Malawi. London: Croom Helm, 1975.	
 Moyse-Bartlett, Hubert. King's African Rifles:A Study in the Military History of East and Central Africa, 1890–1945. Aldershot: Gale and Polden, 1956.	
 Msiska, A. Africana periodicals: A Select Bibliography. Zomba, 1975.	
 Mukhoti, Bela. The IMF and MalawiA Case Study. Washington, D.C.: US Dept. of Agriculture, 1986.
 Mullenbach, Hugh. Urbanization on the African continent: A Select Annotated Bibliography. Evanston: Northwestern University Press, 1975.	
 Munger, Edwin. President Kamuzu Banda of Malawi. Hanover:American Universities Field Staff, 1969.	
 Munger, Edwin. Trading with the Devil. Hanover: American Universities Field Staff, 1969.	
 National Archives of Rhodesia and Nyasaland. A Select Bibliography of Recent Publications. Salisbury: Government Printer, 1960.	
 Ofcansky, Thomas. British East Africa 1856–1963: An Annotated Bibliography. New York: Garland, 1985.	
 Ofori, Patrick. Black African Traditional Religions and Philosophy: A Select Bibliography. Nendeln: Kraus-Thomson, 1975.	
 Ofori, Patrick. Christianity in Tropical Africa: A Selective Annotated Bibliographic Guide. Nendeln: Kto, 1976.”
 Ohrn, S. and Riley, R. Africa from Real to Reel: An African Filmography. Waltham: African Studies Associates, 1976.	
 Paden, John and Soja, Edward, eds. The African Experience: Bibliography. Evanston:Northwestern University Press, 1970.	
 Page, Melvin, ed. Land and Labor in Rural Malawi. East Lansing: Michigan State University, 1973.	
 Panofsky, Hans. A Bibliography of Africana. Westport: Greenwood Press, 1975.	
 Pollak, O. and K. Theses and Dissertations on Southern Africa; an International Bibliography. Boston:African Studies Center, 1976.	
 Price Waterhouse. Doing Business in Malawi. New York: Price Waterhouse, 1984.	
 Report of the Commission to Examine the Salary Scales and Conditions of Services of Local Officers. Nyasaland Government, May 1964.	
 Rousseau, Marguerite. A Bibliography on African Education in the Federation of Rhodesia and Nyasaland. Salisbury: Cassell and Company, 1958.	
 Saulniers, S. and Rakowski, C., eds. Women in the Development Process: A Select Bibliography on Women in Subsaharan Africa and Latin America. Austin: University of Texas. 1977.	
 Scheub, Harold. African Oral Narratives, Proverbs, Riddles, Poetry and Song. Boston: G.K. Hall, 1977.	
 Scheub, Harold. Bibliography of African Oral Narratives. Madison: University of Wisconsin Press, 1971.	
 Scheven, Yvette. Bibliographies for African Studies, 1970–75. Waltham: Crossroads Press, 1977.	
 Schimmelfenning, Else. Malawi. Bonn: K. Schroeder, 1965.	
 Segal, R., et al. Political Africa. New York: Stevens and Sons, 1961.	
 Short, Philip. Banda. London: Routledge and Kegan Paul, 1974.	
 South, A. Guide to Federal Archives Relative to Africa. Waltham, 1977.	
 Stone, Ruth. African Music and Oral Data: a Catalog of Field Recordings, 1902–1975. Bloomington: Indiana University Press, 1976.	
 Travis, Carole and Alman, Miriam. Periodicals from Africa; A Bibliography. Boston:G.K. Hall, 1977.
 U.S. Department of State. A Selected Bibliography: Subsaharan Africa. Foreign Service Institute, 1986.	
 U.S. Library of Congress. Serials for African Studies (compiled by H. Conover). Washington, D.C., 1961.
 Williams, T. David. Malawi:The Politics of Despair. Ithaca: Cornell University Press, 1978.
 Wright, F.C. African Consumers in Nyasaland and Tanganyika. London:H.M. Stationery Office, 1955.	

Turkey
Bilateral relations of Turkey